Gustavo Boccoli (born 16 February 1978) is a retired Brazilian-Israeli footballer. He was a versatile midfielder who played most of his career for Israeli Premier League club Maccabi Haifa.

Early and personal life 
After multiple attempts of application for Israeli citizenship, and after he was given only a temporary resident status, Boccoli was given a permanent resident status and an Israeli ID card on 7 July 2013. He finally became a legitimate Naturalized citizen of Israel on 7 December 2013.

He resided in Haifa, Israel, with his wife Jozi and son Gaby.

Club career 
He joined Israel's Maccabi Haifa after his former team, Maccabi Ahi Nazareth, dropped to the second division in the 2003–2004 season. He won the 2004–2005 championship with Haifa. He can play in the centre midfield and as a winger and can also occupy the "Number 10 position" behind the striker. During 2008, he drew more fouls than any other player in Israeli Premier League. Boccoli was voted "footballer of the year" by the Israeli Premier League players in 2006, after scoring 12 goals, assisting 9 goals and helping Maccabi Haifa to win its third championship in a row and a Toto Cup.

Style of play 
Boccoli played most of his career as a right winger. He is a box-to-box player, running along the right wing non-stop, has great dribbling ability and good technique, and really keeps good physical fitness. Boccoli can shoot from distance, and he scored many goals from outside the box. He also excels in extracting offenses, as his defenders find it difficult to guard him.

In recent seasons Boccoli has started playing as a defensive midfielder and as a central midfielder. In this role Boccoli outstanding fighting spirit and motivation, expressed extracting a ball and press on the opposing team midfielders.

On June 24, 2015 Boccoli decided to retire from football. He will mostly be known for his 11 years with Maccabi Haifa, there he made 434 caps and scored 39 goals.

Later career 
Boccoli also speaks Hebrew, and hosted a weekly cooking show on Benny Bashan's radio show called Benny in the Radio on Israeli radio station Galei Tzahal.

He was appointed as a scout for Israeli club Maccabi Haifa, after his retirement as a football player.

Honours
Israeli Premier League (4):
2004–05, 2005–06, 2008–09, 2010–11
Toto Cup (2):
2005–06, 2007–08

See also 

 List of Israelis

References

1978 births
Living people
Brazilian footballers
Brescia Calcio players
Hapoel Ramat Gan F.C. players
Hakoah Maccabi Ramat Gan F.C. players
Maccabi Ahi Nazareth F.C. players
Maccabi Haifa F.C. players
Footballers from São Paulo
Liga Leumit players
Association football midfielders
Israeli Premier League players
Expatriate footballers in Israel
Israeli people of Brazilian descent
Naturalized citizens of Israel
Israeli Footballer of the Year recipients